De Zwaluw (English: The Swallow) is a smock mill in Hasselt, Overijssel, Netherlands which is run by volunteers every Saturday.

History 
The mill was built in 1784 just outside the city walls of Hasselt.

Picture gallery

External links
Website of the mill (in Dutch)
 Google fotoshow of the mill
 De Zwaluw in the Dutch Mills database

Smock mills in the Netherlands
Rijksmonuments in Overijssel
Octagonal buildings in the Netherlands
18th-century architecture
Buildings and structures completed in 1784